Filip Horanský and Jiří Veselý were the defending champions but were both ineligible to compete.

Liam Broady and Joshua Ward-Hibbert won the title, defeating Adam Pavlásek and Filip Veger in the final 6–3, 6–2.

Seeds

Draw

Finals

Top half

Bottom half

External links
 Main Draw

Boys' Doubles
2012